Princess Marie Ernestine Josephine Adolphine Henriette Therese Elisabeth Alexandrine of Hanover (2 December 1849 – 4 June 1904) was the younger daughter of King George V of Hanover and his wife, Marie of Saxe-Altenburg.

Biography

Marie was born in the city of Hanover. She held the title of Princess with the style of Royal Highness in the Kingdom of Hanover. In the United Kingdom, she held the title of Princess with the style Her Highness as a male line great-granddaughter of King George III.

In 1866 Marie's father was deposed as king of Hanover. Marie and her mother remained in Hanover for over a year, residing at Schloss Marienburg, until they went into exile in Austria in July 1867. Eventually the family settled at Gmunden.

Marriage prospects
Marie visited England with her family in May 1876, and again, after her father's death, in June 1878. Her sister Frederica moved to England where she married, but Marie returned to Gmunden where she remained single and lived with her mother at Schloss Cumberland (named after her father's British ducal title). An American newspaper suggests that Marie twice turned down an offer of marriage from Queen Victoria's third son the Duke of Connaught.

Death
Marie died at Gmunden at the age of 54. Her funeral was the day after her death since two days later her niece Princess Alexandra of Hanover and Cumberland was scheduled to marry Grand Duke Friedrich Franz IV of Mecklenburg-Schwerin. Marie is buried in the family mausoleum at Schloss Cumberland next to her mother who outlived her by three years.

Ancestry

References

1849 births
1904 deaths
British princesses
Hanoverian princesses
House of Hanover
Nobility from Hanover
Burials at the Schloss Cumberland Mausoleum
People from Gmunden
Daughters of kings